Business Connexion (Pty) Ltd. (BCX) is a South African-based information and communications technology (ICT) company. BCX is also listed on the Johannesburg Stock Exchange (JSE) The ICT group has operations in Africa, Europe and the Middle East. In Africa, Bcx expands to Kenya, Mozambique, Namibia, Nigeria, Zambia and Tanzania. The group also has offices in the United Kingdom. BCX has the largest data centre capacity in Southern Africa.

History

BCX's history dates back to 1979 through the formation of Persetel (Proprietary) Limited. This company merged with Q Data Limited to form the Persetel Q Data Holdings group of companies in 1997. It was then that Persetel Q Data Holdings made a number of European networking acquisitions and subsequently changed its name to Comparex Holdings in November 1998.

In December 2003, Comparex announced its intention to merge with Business Connection and in 2004, the largest Information Technology black economic empowerment deal occurred when Comparex merged with Business Connection. The new combined entity's annual revenue were in excess of R3 billion at the time. Founded in 1996 by the then CEO Benjamin Mophatlane and his twin brother Isaac, BCX merged with Seattle Solutions in 2001.

This merged entity was renamed Business Connexion (Proprietary) Limited, the holdings company was renamed Business Connexion Group Limited and the company has traded since then under the current share code of "BCX". Business Connexion was separately listed on 28 May 2004.

References 

Companies based in Johannesburg
South African brands